Pistol dueling was a sport at the 1906 Intercalated Games and 1908 Olympics.

In the 1906 Intercalated Games, male competitors fired duelling pistols at plaster dummies from 20m and 30m.

In 1908 pistol dueling was demonstrated as part of the concurrent Franco-British Exhibition, using the Olympic fencing arena and in front of invited guests.  There were no official demonstration sports until 1912.  The competition involved two male competitors firing at each other with dueling pistols loaded with wax bullets and wearing protective equipment for the torso, face, and hands. Teams were sent by countries including France, the UK, and the USA.  The 20-meter competition was won by the French team of Major Ferrus, J Marais and J Rouvcanachi.

1906 medal summary

References

Dueling
Shooting sports
1906 Intercalated Games events
Shooting at the 1908 Summer Olympics